Marysville High School may refer to:

Marysville High School (California)
Marysville High School (Michigan)
Marysville High School (Ohio)